Heterodraba is a monotypic genus of plants in the family Brassicaceae containing the single species Heterodraba unilateralis, which is known by the common name ladiestongue mustard. It is native to western North America, where it can be found in Oregon, central California, and northern Mexico, generally in open, grassy habitats. It is an annual herb with a short, hairy stem bearing small white flowers.

References

External links
 Jepson Manual Treatment
 USDA Plants Profile

Brassicaceae
Flora of California
Flora of Oregon
Flora of Mexico
Monotypic Brassicaceae genera